Roberto García (born March 26, 1980) is a Mexican professional boxer.

Early life
García moved to Houston, Texas at an early age. It was in Houston that García began to box. His father turned his home into a gym where he trained, and he began boxing at the age of 16. In his junior year in high school he was challenged by a local Boys and Girls Club Champion at school. "My very first sparring session ended really quick. It was over in the beginning round. Right when I punched him on the nose he quit, I'm it pretty sure it was broken", García was quoted as saying. The local boxing coach spoke to him after the sparring session and convinced him to begin boxing.

During the next three years, García won three consecutive Rio Grande Valley Golden Gloves Championships. He set his sights on the pro ranks. He left home to train in Reynosa, Mexico. García, after a few amateur bouts he knew he would want to turn pro.

Amateur career

On his first Tamamulipas Regional Championship Tournament, García won the first 2 bouts by knockout. In the finals he met last years champion, in what was considered as the fight of the Tamamulipas Regional Championship. García won in a close decision, ending his amateur career with a record of 23 wins and 3 loss (17 KOs).

Pro career

García drew attention in boxing by winning 8 fights, 7 by KO in his first year as a pro. Signing a professional contract he began fighting on more exciting undercards, several televised by Telefutura and NBC. "Fighting on the cards of boxing stars makes me work harder", García said, "because I want to be where they are. I want to be a World Champion!"

Suffering a loss in April 2003 to Calvin Odem, García parted ways with his trainer and found Nelson Fernandez, manager of former WBA Welterweight Champion Andrew Lewis.

Latin Fury 14

García worked with Freddie Roach and Eric Brown in preparation for his fight on the Latin Fury card which was highlighted by Garcia taking on three-time world welterweight champion Antonio Margarito from Aguascalientes, Mexico. On May 8, 2010, García lost a bout with America's Antonio Margarito at La Feria de San Marcos, Aguascalientes, Mexico. Jorge Solis and Jose Benavidez were also featured on the card.

Premier Boxing Champions
García was set to appear in the first Premier Boxing Champions on NBC against Errol Spence, Jr. on June 20, 2015. Garcia completely failed to make weight and the fight was called off. Garcia was said to have been ordering tacos and cheeseburgers from room service the week of the fight. The fight was to take place at MGM Grand Casino in Las Vegas, Nevada. García backed out of the fight three days before the card due to weight issues. He was replaced by Phil LoGreco.

Professional boxing record

References

External links

Roberto García fighter profile, premierboxingchampions.com; accessed January 29, 2016.

1980 births
Living people
Mexican male boxers
Boxers from Tamaulipas
Light-middleweight boxers
People from Reynosa
Sportspeople from Houston
Mexican emigrants to the United States
21st-century Mexican people